Nossa Senhora das Dores ("Our Lady of Sorrows") is a bairro in the District of Sede in the municipality of Santa Maria, in the Brazilian state of Rio Grande do Sul. It is located in northeast Santa Maria.

Villages 
The bairro contains the following villages: Dores, Loteamento Bela Vista, Loteamento Londero, Vila Cassel, Vila Roemer, Vila Rossato, Vila Sinhá, Vila São Luiz, Vila Tombési.

References 

Bairros of Santa Maria, Rio Grande do Sul